Paul Carozza (born 14 April 1966, Brisbane, Queensland)is a retired former international rugby player for Australia. Carozza career lasted from 1990 to 1993 in which he played in the position of winger. He was injured for the 1991 World Cup but returned in time for the one off test against South Africa in 1992, scoring twice in the 26–3 win. He also toured Europe in the same year.  All Black prop Richard Loe smashed his forearm into Carozza's nose, breaking it, after he had scored against New Zealand in Brisbane, Australia in the 19–17 win. He won 15 caps in his career before his final appearance on July 17, 1993 where Australia lost against New Zealand. He is currently the head coach of the QAS Reds Rugby Academy.

References

External links
http://www.sporting-heroes.net/rugby-heroes/displayhero.asp?HeroID=465

1966 births
Living people
Australian rugby union players
Australia international rugby union players
People educated at Brisbane State High School
Rugby union wings
Rugby union players from Brisbane